The Caín River is a river in San Germán, Puerto Rico.

References

External links
 USGS Hydrologic Unit Map – Caribbean Region (1974)

Rivers of Puerto Rico